"Boombox" is the debut single by American actress and singer Laura Marano. It was released on March 11, 2016 through Big Machine Records as the lead single from her upcoming debut album. It was written by Joe Kirkland, Jason Dean, Rami Jrade and Asia Whiteacre. The song is a dance-pop song with elements of electropop. A music video for the song was released on April 4, 2016, and has more than 66 million views. Ken Jeong makes an appearance in the music video.

Background
In March 2015, Laura Marano signed with Big Machine Records. In the summer of 2015, Marano began speaking publicly about her debut single, aiming for a summer 2015 release. However, towards the end of the summer, Marano confirmed that the single would be released in 2016. Radio Disney premiered the song during Marano's radio show "For the Record" on March 8 and the song was released on March 11, 2016 worldwide. In early 2019, the song along with "La La", were re-released under her independent label Flip Phone Records.

Music video 
A music video directed by Cole Walliser for the song was released on April 4, 2016. The video has a video-within-a-video format and features comedian Ken Jeong, playing the director of the video, along with his daughter Zooey Jeong. In the video Ken Jeong is showing Laura Marano how to do the choreography, as she is having trouble performing it. The video has amassed over 65 million views on YouTube. "Boombox" has also been nominated for a Streamy Award.

Live performances
Laura Marano performed the song live at the 2016 Radio Disney Music Awards on May 1, 2016. She then performed the song on the Today show on May 31, 2016.

Charts

Release history

References

2015 songs
American pop songs
2016 debut singles
Songs written by Asia Whiteacre